Worth the Pain is the debut studio album by American hard rock band Letters from the Fire.  Released on 9 September 2016, the work was published via Sand Hill Records.

Background 
In May 2016, the ensemble added a new female vocalist by the name of Alexa Kabazie before broadcasting the music video for "Give In to Me", the very first single from the album. On September 9, 2016, the ensemble released the work, produced by Kile Odell.  In December 2016, the ensemble released videos for both "Control" and "Worth the Pain", two tunes from the album.

Critical reception 
The album is portrayed by Larry Petro of American radio station KNAC as "Evanescence meets Lacuna Coil (sans the unclean singing) with the heavy backbone of Disturbed".

Track listing

Personnel 
 Alexa Kabazie – vocals
 Mike Keller – rhythm guitar
 Cameron Stucky – lead guitar
 Clayton Wages – bass
 Ben Anderson - drums

Charts

Album

Singles

References

External links 
 

2016 debut albums
Letters from the Fire albums